Ricardo Mannetti (born 24 April 1975) is a Namibian former footballer who now works as a coach. He recently coaches the Namibia national team.

Mannetti played as a midfielder in South Africa for Santos.

He competed for the Namibia national football team from 1994–2003, including the 1998 African Cup of Nations. Before he resigned in June 2015, he competed in the COSAFA cup and lead the Namibian National team to their first international Trophy victory.
He was re-appointed coach in September 2015 after patching things up with the Namibia Football Association.
Mannetti has led the Namibian national team, Brave Warriors to their first ever 2015 Cosafa Cup triumph in SA, helping the country reach the quarter finals of the 2018 CHAN Games in Cameroon, leading the team to the 2019 Afcon in Egypt.

References

External links

 Ricardo Mannetti Interview (1)
 Ricardo Mannetti Interview (2)
 Soccer-Video game puts coach on road to World Cup glory

1975 births
Living people
Namibia international footballers
F.C. Civics Windhoek players
Namibian expatriate footballers
Namibian expatriate sportspeople in South Africa
1998 African Cup of Nations players
Expatriate soccer players in South Africa
Santos F.C. (South Africa) players
Bush Bucks F.C. players
Footballers from Windhoek
Namibia national football team managers
Namibian football managers
Association football midfielders
2019 Africa Cup of Nations managers
Namibian men's footballers